That Luzmela Girl (Spanish:La niña de Luzmela) is a 1949 Spanish drama film directed by Ricardo Gascón and starring Modesto Cid and Irene Caba Alba. It is an adaptation of the 1909 novel of the same title by Concha Espina.

Cast
 Emilia Baró   
 Olga Batalla   
 Irene Caba Alba   
 Modesto Cid  
 Alfonso Estela   
 Osvaldo Genazzani  
 Antonio Martí  
 Laly Monty   
 María Rosa Salgado 
 Fernando Sancho    
 Juana Soler   
 José Suarez   
 Juan Valero    
 Juan Velilla

References

Bibliography
 de España, Rafael. Directory of Spanish and Portuguese film-makers and films. Greenwood Press, 1994.

External links 

1949 films
1949 drama films
Spanish drama films
1940s Spanish-language films
Films based on Spanish novels
Films directed by Ricardo Gascón
Spanish black-and-white films
1940s Spanish films